Two ships of the Japanese Navy have been named Sumire:

 , a  launched in 1919 and used as a training ship after being decommissioned in 1940. Renamed Mitaka in 1945 and scrapped in 1948.
 , a  launched in 1944 and expended as a target in 1947

Imperial Japanese Navy ship names
Japanese Navy ship names